North Plympton is a suburb of Adelaide, South Australia, in the City of West Torrens.

The historic Parkin House (or Plympton House) which dates from before 1860 and houses an important piano collection, is situated at 4 Lewis Crescent, North Plympton. It is listed on the South Australian Heritage Register.

To the north is Adelaide Airport, Adelaide's main airport.

References

Suburbs of Adelaide